Combs Township is a township in Carroll County, in the U.S. state of Missouri.

Combs Township was erected in 1872, and named after Colonel Howard T. Combs, a county official.

References

Townships in Missouri
Townships in Carroll County, Missouri